Skadi Mons  is a mountain on Venus in Maxwell Montes, at the center of Ishtar Terra. It is the highest point of the planet with an altitude of about 10,700 meters (about 35,000 feet) above the mean planetary radius.

See also 
 List of quadrangles on Venus
 List of montes on Venus

References

External links 
 
  (USGS I-2490).

Ishtar Terra quadrangle
Mountains on Venus